The Providence River is a tidal river in the U.S. state of Rhode Island. It flows approximately 8 miles (13 km). There are no dams along the river's length, although the Fox Point Hurricane Barrier is located south of downtown to protect the city of Providence from damaging tidal floods.

The southern part of the river has been dredged at a cost of $65 million in federal and state funds to benefit nearby marinas and commercial shipping interests.

The Dutch called the Providence River the Nassau River. It was the northeastern limit of Dutch claims in the colonial era, owing to Adriaen Block's exploration of Narragansett Bay, from 1614 until the Hartford Treaty of 1650. It can, therefore, be regarded as the original boundary between the English New England colonies and the Dutch colony of New Netherland.

Course
The river is formed by the confluence of the Woonasquatucket and Moshassuck rivers in downtown Providence. One half mile downstream, it is joined from the east by the Seekonk River and continues south. The cities of Providence, Cranston, and Warwick lie to the west of the river, while the city of East Providence and the town of Barrington lie to the east. At the narrows between Conimicut Point, in Warwick to the west and Nayatt Point in Barrington to the east, the Conimicut Shoal Lighthouse marks the entrance to the river from Narragansett Bay.

Recreation
Since the late 1990s, the Providence River has been known for gondola rides, which can be enjoyed by tourists and locals daily in season. Providence's three gondolas and one sandolo are hand made in Italy

Crossings 

Below is a list of all crossings over the Providence River. The list starts at the headwaters and goes downstream.
Providence
Washington Place
College Street
Crawford Street
Old Interstate 195
Michael S. Van Leesten Memorial Bridge
Point Street Bridge
Fox Point Hurricane Barrier
Providence River Bridge (I-195)

Tributaries 

Seekonk River 
Pawtuxet River
Moshassuck River
Woonasquatucket River

See also
Green Jacket Shoal
List of rivers in Rhode Island
Warren River
Maps from the United States Geological Survey

References

External links

Providence.edu Providence River Dredging Project Answer Sheet

Rivers of Providence County, Rhode Island
Rivers of Kent County, Rhode Island
 01
Geography of Providence, Rhode Island
Narragansett Bay
Rivers of Rhode Island